Torah Lehranstalt, yeshiva of the Breuer family in Germany
 Yeshiva Rabbi Samson Raphael Hirsch, yeshiva of Rabbi Joseph Breuer in New York

See also 
 Khal Adath Jeshurun

Disambiguation pages